Machaeroidinae ("dagger-like") is an extinct subfamily of carnivorous sabre-toothed placental mammals from extinct family Oxyaenidae, that lived from the early to middle Eocene of Asia and North America. Traditionally classified as hyaenodonts, this group is now classified as a member of the family Oxyaenidae.

Classification and phylogeny

Taxonomy
 Subfamily: †Machaeroidinae (Matthew, 1909)
 Genus: †Apataelurus (Scott, 1937)
 †Apataelurus kayi (Scott, 1937)
 †Apataelurus pishigouensis (Tong & Lei, 1986)
 Genus: †Diegoaelurus (Zack, Poust & Wagner, 2022)
 Diegoaelurus vanvalkenburghae (Zack, Poust & Wagner, 2022)
 Genus: †Isphanatherium (Lavrov & Averianov, 1998)
 Isphanatherium ferganensis (Lavrov & Averianov, 1998)
 Genus: †Machaeroides (Matthew, 1909)
 †Machaeroides eothen (Matthew, 1909)
 †Machaeroides simpsoni (Dawson, 1986)
 Incertae sedis:
 †Machaeroidinae sp. (CM 2386) (Zack, 2019)
 †Machaeroidinae sp. (FMNH PM 1506) (Tomiya, 2021)
 †Machaeroidinae sp. (USNM 173514) (Zack, 2019)

Phylogeny
The phylogenetic relationships of the subfamily Machaeroidinae are shown in the following cladogram:

See also
 Mammal classification
 Oxyaenidae

References